In fluid mechanics (specifically rheology), a rheoscope is an instrument for detecting or measuring the viscosity of a fluid. 

In the study of blood flow, a rheoscope is used to observe and measure the deformation of blood cells subject to different levels of fluid shear stress.

References

 

Fluid mechanics
Scientific instruments